The Grammy Award for Best Rap Solo Performance was awarded from 1991 to 2011, alongside the Best Rap Performance by a Duo or Group.  Previously, a single award was presented for Best Rap Performance.

In 2003, this award was split into separate awards for Best Female Rap Solo Performance and Best Male Rap Solo Performance.  In 2005, it was again presented as a single award.

As of 2012, the award was permanently discontinued due to a major overhaul of Grammy categories. Since 2012, all solo and duo/group rap performances has been shifted to the revived Best Rap Performance category.

Years reflect the year in which the Grammy Awards were presented, for works released from October a year and a half prior to September the previous year.

Recipients

 Each year is linked to the article about the Grammy Awards held that year.

Category facts
Most wins in this category (including male & female solo wins)
1. Eminem – 4 wins
2. Missy Elliott- 3 wins
3. LL Cool J, Will Smith, Jay-Z & Kanye West- 2 wins
Most nominations in this category (Including Male & Female Solo Nominations)
1. Eminem- 8 nominations
2. Jay-Z – 7 nominations
3. LL Cool J, Missy Elliott & Busta Rhymes- 5 nominations
4. Queen Latifah, Kanye West & T.I.- 4 nominations
5. Nelly, Common, MC Hammer, Will Smith & Coolio- 3 nominations
Most nominations without a win
1. Busta Rhymes- 5 nominations
2. Ludacris- 4 nominations
3. Common & 50 Cent- 3 nominations
4. Lupe Fiasco, Mos Def, Nas, Snoop Dogg, DMX, Drake, 2Pac, Monie Love & The Notorious B.I.G.- 2 nominations

References

 
Best Rap Solo Performance
Rap Solo Performance
Rapping